The triple jump, sometimes referred to as the hop, step and jump or the hop, skip and jump, is a track and field event, similar to the long jump.  As a group, the two events are referred to as the "horizontal jumps".  The competitor runs down the track and performs a hop, a bound and then a jump into the sand pit. The triple jump was inspired by the ancient Olympic Games and has been a modern Olympics event since the Games' inception in 1896.

According to World Athletics rules, "the hop shall be made so that an athlete lands first on the same foot
as that from which he has taken off; in the step he shall land on the
other foot, from which, subsequently, the jump is performed."

History
Historical sources on the ancient Olympic Games occasionally mention jumps of 15 meters or more. This led sports historians to conclude that these must have been a series of jumps, thus providing the basis for the triple jump. However, there is no evidence for the triple jump being included in the ancient Olympic Games, and the recorded extraordinary distances may be due to the artistic license of the authors of victory poems, rather than attempts to report accurate results.

The triple jump was a part of the inaugural modern Olympics in 1896 in Athens, although at the time it consisted of two hops on the same foot and then a jump. In fact, the first modern Olympic champion, James Connolly, was a triple jumper. Early Olympics also included the standing triple jump, although this has since been removed from the Olympic program and is rarely performed in competition today. The women's triple jump was introduced into the Atlanta Olympics in 1996.

In Irish mythology the geal-ruith (triple jump), was an event contested in the ancient Irish Tailteann Games as early as 1829 BC.

Technique

Approach

The approach is one of the most important parts of an athlete's jump. The athlete sprints down a runway to a takeoff mark, from which the triple jump is measured. The takeoff mark is commonly either a piece of wood or similar material embedded in the runway, or a rectangle painted on the runway surface.  In modern championships, a strip of plasticine, tape, or modeling clay is attached to the far edge of the board to record athletes overstepping or "scratching" the mark, defined by the trailing edge of the board. These boards are placed at different places on the runway depending on how far the athlete can jump. Typically the boards are set 40 ft, 32 ft, and 24 ft from the pit. These are the most common boards seen at the high school and collegiate levels, but boards can be placed anywhere on the runway. There are three phases of the triple jump:  the "hop" phase, the "bound" or "step" phase, and the "jump" phase. They all play an important role in the jump itself. These three phases are executed in one continuous sequence. The athlete has to maintain a good speed through each phase. They should also try to stay consistent to avoid fouls.

Hop

The hop begins with the athlete jumping from the take-off board on one leg, which for descriptive purposes, will be the right leg. Precise placement of the foot on the take-off is important for the athlete to avoid a foul. The objective of the first phase is to hop out, with athletes focusing all momentum forward. The hop landing phase is very active, involving a powerful backward "pawing" action of the right leg, with the right take-off foot landing heel first on the runway.

Step

The hop landing also marks the beginning of the step phase, where the athlete utilizes the backward momentum of the right leg to immediately execute a powerful jump forward and upwards, the left leg assisting the take-off with a hip flexion thrust similar to a bounding motion. This leads to the step-phase mid-air position, with the right take-off leg trailing flexed at the knee, and the left leg now leading flexed at the hip and knee. The jumper then holds this position for as long as possible, before extending the knee of the leading left leg and then immediately beginning a powerful backward motion of the whole left leg, again landing on the runway with a powerful backward pawing action. The takeoff leg should be fully extended with the drive leg thigh just below parallel to the ground. The takeoff leg stays extended behind the body with the heel held high. The drive leg extends with a flexed ankle and snaps downward for a quick transition into the jump phase. The athlete tries to take the farthest step they can while maintaining balance and control, using techniques such as pulling their leg up as high as possible.

Jump

The step landing forms the take-off of the final phase (the jump), where the athlete utilizes the backward force from the left leg to take off again.  The jump phase is very similar to the long jump although most athletes have lost too much speed by this time to manage a full hitch kick, and mostly used is a hang or sail technique.

When landing in the sand-filled pit, the jumper should aim to avoid sitting back on landing or placing either hand behind the feet. The sandpit usually begins 13m from the take-off board for male international competition or 11m from the board for international female and club-level male competition. Each phase of the triple jump should get progressively higher, and there should be a regular rhythm to the three landings.

Foul

A "foul", also known as a "scratch", or missed jump, occurs when a jumper oversteps the takeoff mark, misses the pit entirely, does not use the correct foot sequence throughout the phases, or does not perform the attempt in the allotted amount of time (usually about 90 seconds). When a jumper "scratches", the seated official will raise a red flag, and the jumper who was "on deck", or up next, prepares to jump.

It shall not be considered a foul if an athlete while jumping, should touch or scrape the ground with his/her "sleeping leg". Also called a "scrape foul", "sleeping leg" touch violations were ruled as fouls before the mid-1980s. The IAAF changed the rules following outrage at the 1980 Summer Olympics in Moscow when Soviet field officials in the Men's Triple Jump ruled as foul eight of the twelve jumps made by two leading competitors (from Brazil and Australia) thus helping two Soviet jumpers win the gold and silver medals.

Records

Note: Results cannot count towards records if they are wind-assisted (>2.0 m/s).

All-time top 25

.

Men (outdoor)

Ancillary marks
Jumps made en route to final marks that would be top 25 performances:
Jonathan Edwards also jumped 18.16 (+1.3) in Gothenburg, Sweden on 7 August 1995.
Christian Taylor also jumped 18.02 (+0.8) in Lausanne, Switzerland on 9 July 2015.
Kenny Harrison also jumped 17.99 (−0.1) in Atlanta, Georgia on 27 July 1996.

Assisted marks
Any performance with a following wind of more than 2.0 metres per second is not counted for record purposes. Below is a list of wind-assisted jumps (equal or superior to 17.75 m). Only the best-assisted mark that is superior to the legal best is shown:
Jonathan Edwards jumped 18.43 (+2.4) in Villeneuve-d'Ascq, France on 25 June 1995.
Willie Banks jumped 18.20 (+5.2) in Indianapolis, Indiana on 16 July 1988.
Mike Conley jumped 18.17 (+2.1) in Barcelona, Spain on 3 August 1992.
Yoelbi Quesada jumped 17.97 (+7.5) in Madrid, Spain on 20 June 1995.
Charles Simpkins jumped 17.93 (+5.2) in Indianapolis, Indiana on 16 July 1988.
Jordan Díaz jumped 17.93 (+2.5) in Nerja, Spain on 26 June 2022.
Christian Olsson jumped 17.92 (+3.4) in Gateshead, United Kingdom on 13 June 2003.
Denis Kapustin jumped 17.86 (+5.7) in Seville, Spain on 5 June 1994.
Nelson Évora jumped 17.82 (+2.5) in Seixal, Portugal on 26 June 2009.
Keith Connor jumped 17.81 (+4.6) in Brisbane, Australia on 9 October 1982.
Kenta Bell jumped 17.76 (+2.2)  in El Paso, Texas on 10 April 2004.
Gennadiy Valyukevich jumped 17.75 (+3.0) in Uzhhorod, Soviet Union on 27 April 1986
Brian Wellman jumped 17.75 (+7.1) in Madrid, Spain on 20 June 1995.

Annulled marks
Lazaro Betancourt jumped 17.78 (+0.6) in Havana, Cuba on 15 June 1986. This performance was annulled after he failed a drug test.

Women (outdoor)

Ancillary marks
Jumps made en route to final marks that would be top 25 performances:
Yulimar Rojas also jumped 15.42 (+1.2) in Lausanne, Switzerland on 26 August 2021; 15.41 (+1.1) in Tokyo, Japan on 1 August 2021; 15.39 (+0.5) in Eugene, Oregon on 18 July 2022; 15.31 (+0.2) in Andújar, Spain on 22 May 2021; 15.27 (−0.4) in Zürich, Switzerland on 9 September 2021; 15.25 (+0.1) in Tokyo on 1 August 2021; 15.24 (+1.1) in Eugene, Oregon on 18 July 2022.
Françoise Mbango Etone also jumped 15.30 (+0.5) in Athens, Greece on 23 August 2004.
Tatyana Lebedeva also jumped 15.28 (−0.3) in Iráklio, Greece on 4 July 2004.

Assisted marks
Any performance with a following wind of more than 2.0 metres per second is not counted for record purposes. Below is a list of wind-assisted jumps (equal or superior to 15.01 m). Only the best-assisted mark that is superior to the legal best is shown:

Magdelin Martínez jumped 15.24 (+4.2)  in Sestriere, Italy on 1 August 2004.
Anna Pyatykh jumped 15.17 (+2.4) in Athens, Greece on 2 July 2006.
Keila da Silva Costa jumped 15.10 (+2.7) in Uberlândia, Brazil on 6 May 2007.
Olga Saladukha jumped 15.06 (+2.3) in Stockholm, Sweden on 29 July 2011.
Liadagmis Povea jumped 15.05 (+3.1) in Havana, Cuba on 8 March 2019.

Men (indoor)

Women (indoor)

Olympic medalists

Men

Women

World Championships medalists

Men

Women

World Indoor Championships medalists

Men

 Known as the World Indoor Games

Women

Season's bests

Men

Women

See also

References

External links

IAAF triple jump homepage
IAAF list of triple-jump records in XML

 
Events in track and field
Summer Olympic disciplines in athletics
Articles containing video clips
Jumping sports